The Bishop of Killaloe and Kilfenora was the Ordinary of the Church of Ireland diocese of Killaloe and Kilfenora in the Province of Cashel; comprising all of County Clare and the northern part of County Tipperary, Republic of Ireland.

The Episcopal see was a union of the bishoprics of Killaloe and Kilfenora which were united in 1752. Under the Church Temporalities (Ireland) Act 1833, Killaloe & Kilfenora combined with Clonfert & Kilmacaduagh to form the united bishopric of Killaloe and Clonfert in 1834.

List of Bishops of Killaloe and Kilfenora

References

Killaloe and Kilfenora
Killaloe and Kilfenora
 
Religion in County Clare